Vanessa Cvujetka Terkes Rachitoff, (born 3 March 1978) is a Peruvian film, television and stage actress. She is best known for her role in the Mexican television series El Pantera, as Lola.

Terkes became popular in Peru for her roles in soap operas Torbellino and Boulevard Torbellino.

Terkes is of Croatian descent.

Filmography

Television

Films

Theatre

References

External links

Actresses from Lima
Peruvian film actresses
Peruvian telenovela actresses
Living people
1978 births
Peruvian people of Croatian descent
20th-century Peruvian actresses
21st-century Peruvian actresses
Peruvian people of Russian descent